Rutilotrixa is a genus of parasitic flies in the family Tachinidae.

Species
Rutilotrixa carinata Barraclough, 1992
Rutilotrixa insectaria Paramonov, 1968
Rutilotrixa lateralis (Walker, 1849)
Rutilotrixa monstruosa (Paramonov, 1968)
Rutilotrixa nigrithorax (Macquart, 1851)
Rutilotrixa tessellata Barraclough, 1992
Rutilotrixa westralica Paramonov, 1968
Rutilotrixa wilsoni Paramonov, 1954

References

Dexiinae
Diptera of Australasia
Tachinidae genera
Taxa named by Charles Henry Tyler Townsend